János Tóth (born 15 April 1978) is a Hungarian racewalker. He competed in the men's 50 kilometres walk at the 2004 Summer Olympics.

References

1978 births
Living people
Athletes (track and field) at the 2004 Summer Olympics
Hungarian male racewalkers
Olympic athletes of Hungary
Place of birth missing (living people)